Laurel Hill Cemetery is an historic cemetery in Saco, Maine, United States. Officially established in 1844, it was one of the first garden cemeteries in the United States.

Notable interments
 Samuel Henry Craig (1863–1929), Medal of Honor recipient
 William H. Deering (186–1957), State representative and Augusta State Hospital Treasurer
 John Fairfield (1797–1847), US Senator and Governor of Maine
 Cyrus King (1772–1817), US Congressman
 Moses Macdonald (1815–1869), US Congressman
 Walter E. Perkins (1859–1925), Actor
 John Fairfield Scamman (1786–1858), US Congressman

References

External links
 
 Laurel Hill Cemetery Association in Saco, Maine, CountyOffice.org
 

Buildings and structures in Saco, Maine
Cemeteries in York County, Maine
1844 establishments in Maine
Rural cemeteries